Lygnern is a lake in the municipalities of Kungsbacka and Mark, western Sweden. With an area of 33 km², it is the largest lake in Halland County. Its main outflow is Rolfsån, which in turn empties out into the Kungsbacka Fjord.

The lake serves as a source of drinking water for Kungsbacka. In 2006, it was nominated as the cleanest lake in Sweden, as 98% of the surveyed residents of the municipality were satisfied with the water quality.

Fishing
Ten fish species have been found in the lake, which is particularly rich in pike, trout and European perch.

References

Lakes of Halland County
Lakes of Västra Götaland County